Eilema arizana is a moth of the subfamily Arctiinae. It is found in Taiwan.

References

Moths described in 1910
arizana
Moths of Taiwan